The Sign of the Crooked Arrow is Volume 28 in the original The Hardy Boys Mystery Stories published by Grosset & Dunlap.

This book was written for the Stratemeyer Syndicate by Andrew E. Svenson in 1949. Between 1959 and 1973, the first 38 volumes of this series were systematically revised as part of a project directed by Harriet Adams, Edward Stratemeyer's daughter. The original version of this book was shortened in 1970 by Priscilla Baker-Carr, resulting in two different stories with the same title.

Plot summary
The Hardy brothers interrupt their investigations of jewelry store holdups to answer a plea from their cousin on a New Mexico cattle ranch. They discover how Arrow cigarettes can knock people out using a gas that comes out from a vent in the ground in New Mexico, originally discovered by American Indians.

References

The Hardy Boys books
1949 American novels
1949 children's books
1970 American novels
1970 children's books
Novels set in New Mexico
Grosset & Dunlap books